Bazaria dulanensis is a species of snout moth in the genus Bazaria. It was described by Y.L. Du and L. Yan in 2009. It is found in Qinghai, China.

The wingspan is 17–18 mm. The forewings are narrow, yellowish white and dusted with fuscous scales. The hindwings are gray.

The larvae mine the leaves of Nitrada tangutorum.

Etymology
The specific name refers to the type locality Dulan.

References

Moths described in 2009
Phycitini
Moths of Asia